Kutu Ma Kutu, also known as Kutu Ma Kutu Supari Dana (Nepali:कुटुमा कुटु or कुटुमा कुटु सुपारी दाना) is a Nepalese song from the 2017 Nepalese film Dui Rupaiya. The song is sung by Rajan Raj Shiwakoti, Melina Rai and Rajan Ishan, with lyrics and music by Rajan Raj Shiwakoti, directed by Asim Shah. The music video of the track features actors Asif Shah, Nischal Basnet, Swastima Khadka and Buddhi Tamang. On 22 December 2017 Kutu Ma Kutu became the first Nepalese YouTube video to reach 100 million views and it is the most viewed Nepalese video on YouTube currently viewing over 120 million times, also it was the fastest song to gain 20 million views and in 49 days the song managed to gain 10 Million views.

The name "Kutu Ma Kutu" is a Neologism that refers as the word kutu kutu mean something that is hard when chewing it and the word supari dana means Areca nut. The word is usually used to invite someone to a function than you chew the nut to accept the invitation. You can read kutu ma kutu lyrics .

Background 
The song is composed by Rajan Raj Shiwakoti, the song has the mix of Nepalese beats including Madal , Bansuri and Contemporary classical music with a classic Nepalese flavor to it. The lyrics were written by Rajan Raj Shiwakoti. Rajan Raj Shiwakoti who is known for bring Nepalese culture into his music videos and songs and he is known for another popular song such as Surkhe Thai, Purba Pashim etc.

Music video 
The music video features popular actors from Nepal including Asif Shah, Nischal Basnet, Swastima Khadka and Buddhi Tamang, in the music video Asif Shah and Nischal Basnet who're running away from the police and they go on a mela (function) while in a run) and dance with Swastima Khadka.

Release 
The music video for song was released on 28 May 2017 in video sharing website YouTube, through the YouTube channel of HighlightsNepal. The music video is the first song released from the film than "Talkyo Jawani" and "Dui Rupaiyan". The song was released under the banner of the G21 Production and Black Horse Pictures.

Critical reception 

The song became Nepal's most viewed video in YouTube currently having more than  100 million views.

Track listing

Awards

Credits and personnel 
Original version
 Rajan Raj Shiwakoti - writer, music and lead vocals
 Shyam Swet Rashaili - mixing
 Rajan Ishan - arranger
 Kabiraj Gahatraj - choreographer
 Lokesh Bajracharya - editor
 Asim Shah - director

See also 
Other major Song and Movies in Nepal include:
 Dui Rupaiya
 Chhakka Panja 2
 Ye Daju Nasamau

References 

Kutu ma kutu Lyrics

2017 songs
Nepalese film songs
Nepalese songs
Nepali-language songs